On 19 February 2003, an Ilyushin Il-76 crashed in mountainous terrain near Kerman in Iran. The aircraft was carrying members of the Islamic Revolutionary Guard, a special force that is independent from the Iranian Army, on an unknown mission.

Strong winds were reported in the region of the crash when the aircraft disappeared from the radar screens; approximately at the same time, villagers in the area described hearing a loud explosion. There were no survivors among the 275 occupants on board the aircraft.  the crash remains the second deadliest on Iranian soil (behind Iran Air Flight 655) and the deadliest crash of an Il-76.

Accident
The Il-76 was flying a route from Zahedan Airport to Kerman Airport carrying members of the Islamic Revolutionary Guard Corps on an unspecified mission. The four-engine Russian transport aircraft lost contact with air traffic control at 5:30 pm after flying into poor weather conditions.

Recovery and aftermath
Immediately after the crash, members of the Revolutionary Guards and Red Crescent were sent to the accident scene. Two helicopters attempting to reach the scene turned back due to bad weather. A cordon of the area was completed as well, limiting access to journalists and the public.

President Mohammad Khatami's cabinet sent a message of condolence to families of the victims about the "tragic event in which a group of IRGC brothers"—Islamic Revolutionary Guards Corps—were killed. The Iranian government also blamed U.S. sanctions against Iran for playing a part in the crash since the restrictions make it more difficult for Iran to maintain its aircraft.

Investigators believe it was a controlled flight into terrain, citing the deteriorating weather conditions and high winds. There was speculation that the accident was the result of a mid-air collision due to the high number of fatalities (the Il-76 normally carries fewer than 200 passengers). A terrorist organization called the Abu-Bakr Brigades also claimed responsibility for the crash.

See also

 2005 Iranian Air Force C-130 crash
 2018 Algerian Air Force Il-76 crash
 Charkhi Dadri mid-air collision, involving an Il-76 and a Boeing 747; and with a higher loss of life

Notes and references

Notes

References

External links 
 

2003 disasters in Iran
Aviation accidents and incidents in Iran
Aviation accidents and incidents in 2003
Accidents and incidents involving the Ilyushin Il-76
2003 in Iran
Accidental deaths in Iran
History of Kerman Province
February 2003 events in Asia
Aviation accidents and incidents involving controlled flight into terrain